Frank Garfield "Gary" Denniss is a Canadian historian, newspaper columnist, retired public school teacher, speaker  and ordained minister born in 1944 in Bracebridge, Ontario  Denniss is the author of 43 books on the history of the District Municipality of Muskoka, (Muskoka District, at the southern edge of the Canadian Shield, stretches north from the Severn River through rocky and forested lake land, bounded by Georgian Bay on the west and Algonquin Park to the east, connecting to twin district Parry Sound.)

Biography

Gary Denniss was born at Bracebridge Memorial Hospital on May 31, 1944, to Frank Edwin Denniss II (1908–2003), and Jessie Evelyn Arnott (1917–1991). Mr Denniss taught in the public schools in the Bracebridge, Ontario area (Wah Wah Taysee, Cochrane, Bracebridge, Vankoughnet, Huntsville, and Macaulay) until his retirement in 1998.  He continues to live in Bracebridge, where he writes, teaches piano, and officiates at weddings and funerals. Since 1991, Mr Denniss has held a leadership role in the maintenance of Bracebridge veterans' gravesites, veterans' memories  and Langford Cemetery, Macaulay Township.

Published works

 "Macaulay Township in Days Gone By" : Herald-Gazette Press, 1970, (Algoma University, Wishart Library).
 "The Pioneer Zimmerman Family of Macaulay Township", newspaper article, Herald-Gazette, Bracebridge, ON. April 2, 1970.
 "A Brief History of the Schools in Muskoka", Herald-Gazette Press, 1972.
 "Free Methodist Hill, a Centennial History", 1879–1979, Herald-Gazette, 1979.
 "The Spirit of the Twelfth (1982); The story of the Orange Order in Canada", Gravenhurst Printing, 1982
 "Muskoka - Ontario’s First District Municipality", 1995, GarDen Press.
 "A Brief History of the Churches in Muskoka", 1997, 1998 and 2003, Publisher: GarDen Press, 2003 (Algoma University, Wishart Library),
 "The Story of Springdale Park", Publisher: Springdale Park Spiritual Association, 1998. , by Gary Denniss.
 "Educating Muskoka District", 1999, by Gary Denniss.
 "The Educational Heritage of Muskoka", 2001 (History of the Muskoka Board of Education), .
 "The Past Before Us: A History of Free Methodist Camp Meetings in Muskoka, 2002, .
 "In Loving Memory: The History of Langford Cemetery", 2006 (collection of obituaries).
 "Going to School in Macaulay", 2010,   by Gary Denniss.
 "The Holditch Family Reunion", Sept. 2013, GarDen Press.
 "Historic Routes of Bracebridge", 2012, GarDen Press.
 "Bracebridge Connections", Vol. 1, 2014, GarDen Press.
 "Bracebridge Connections", Vol. 2, 2015, GarDen Press 
 "Bracebridge in the Fifties", 2016, GarDen Press 
 "Bracebridge in the Sixties", 2017, GarDen Press 
 "Bracebridge in the Seventies", GarDen Press, February 2018,   
 "Muskoka Scrapbook" (series of eight books: Individual years, 1926, 1936, 1946, 1956, 1966, 1976 (two volumes), 1952. 
 "A Good Town Continues - Bracebridge 1915–1999", contributed to by Gary Denniss.
 "The Orange Lodge and its History in Muskoka", 1999.
 "Titch of Muskoka (a seven-part series)"
 "Muskoka Scrapbook - a five-part series of books on World War 1" -1914, 1915, 1916, 1917, 1918): Volume 1 , Volume 2 , Volume 3 , Volume 4 , Volume 5    "Muskoka Scrapbook - Speaker Series", sponsored by Muskoka Steamship and Historical Society", First speaker, Gary Denniss, Sun., April 22, 2007.
 Bracebridge in the Eighties,  December 2018, zharDen Press 
 The Family Heritage of Howard and Sheila Vincent, December 2018, GarDen Press
 "The Arnott's of 36 Edward Street", June 2019.
 "Muskoka Memories 101", November 2019, 
 "Muskoka Memories 102" 
 "Muskoka Memories 103", October 2021

Other Links

https://garydenniss.ca/

https://www.youtube.com/watch?v=srTeIAKzUCU

Reviews
 "Among local Historians, Gary Denniss is Royalty", by Ted Currie, Muskoka Today, Nov. 3–17 issue, 1995.

Awards and honors
 Lieutenant Governor's Ontario Heritage Award for Lifetime Achievement, presented by Lt. Gov. David Onley, Feb. 21, 2013 
 Heritage Community Recognition Award, presented to Mr. Denniss at the Rene Caisse Theatre, the Town of Bracebridge, by Councillor Steve Clement and C. Hammond, June 27, 2012 
 Robert J. Boyer Award, "honours the dedication of individuals in our community who work to keep the natural and cultural history of our region alive", presented to Gary Denniss by the Board of Directors, Muskoka Conservancy, May 17, 2013.

References

External links

  http://freepages.genealogy.rootsweb.ancestry.com/~murrayp/muskoka/macaulay/langford/index.htm
  http://www.bracebridge.ca/en/live-here/Cemeteries.aspx?_mid_=1499#
  http://www.heritagetrust.on.ca/en/index.php/pages/programs/recognition-programs
  http://gravenhurstmuskoka.blogspot.ca/2014/03/congratulations-to-muskoka-historian.html
  https://www.churchesinyourtown.ca/communities/bracebridge/sermons/speaker/gary-denniss

1944 births
Canadian biographers
Canadian educators
20th-century Canadian historians
Canadian male non-fiction writers
Canadian schoolteachers
Canadian people of German descent
Canadian people of English descent
Free Methodist Church ministers
Historians of Canada
Living people
People from Bracebridge, Ontario
20th-century antiquarians
Wilfrid Laurier University alumni
21st-century Canadian historians